The 2001–02 season is River Plate's 72nd season in the Argentine Primera División. 
The season was split into two tournaments (format adopted since 1990–91 season) Apertura (Opening) 2001 (from August to December 2001), and Clausura (Closing) 2002 (from February to May 2002).

The club's kit was provided by Adidas, and the sponsor was Quilmes beer until December 2001, and Budweiser beer since March 2002.

Season events

After finishing both tournaments of 2000–01 season(Apertura 2000 and Clausura 2001) in second place, River Plate joined eight players to the squad (five before the start of the Apertura tournament and three before the start of Clausura). This season also marked the return of Ramón Díaz as Coach, after he had left in January 2000.

On 9 March 2002, River Plate signed a deal with Budweiser to be the main sponsor of the team kit. The 2-year deal was closed for AR$2,400,000 per year (equivalent to US$780,487.80 according to March 2002 exchange rate).

On 19 March, River Plate introduced the new kit for the main team. The kit was worn for the first time on 24 March, when River visited Velez Sarsfield.

After finishing vice-champions of Racing Club, in the first half of the season, River Plate won the Clausura Championship, qualifying for the 2002 Copa Sudamericana and 2003 Copa Libertadores.

Apertura squad

Clausura Squad

Transfers

In
 Angel Comizzo July 2001, from Monarcas Morelia 
 Esteban Cambiasso July 2001, from Independiente 
 Matías Lequi August 2001, from Rosario Central 
 Alejandro Escalona July 2001, from S.L. Benfica 
 Juan Esnáider January 2002 
 Alejandro Damián Domínguez January 2002 
 Daniel Fonseca January 2002 
 Claudio Husaín January 2002, from S.S.C. Napoli

Out
 Javier Saviola July 2001 to Barcelona FC 
 Mario Yepes January 2002 to FC Nantes Atlantique 
 Gustavo Lombardi 	January 2002 to Deportivo Alavés 
 Damián Ariel Álvarez January 2002 to Reggina Calcio

Competitions

Apertura 2001

Fixtures and results

League table

Clausura 2002

Fixtures & results

League table

Copa Mercosur 2001

Group E

At the 2001 Copa Mercosur, River Plate was eliminated in the group stage.

Fixtures and results

Copa Libertadores 2002

Group 7

Round of 16

At the 2002 Copa Libertadores, River Plate was eliminated in the Round of 16.

Fixture and results

Player statistics

Appearances and goals

|}

References

External links
Estévez, Diego Ariel; Ciento cinco: historia de un siglo rojo y blanco; 2006 

Club Atlético River Plate seasons
2001–02 in Argentine football
River Plate